The 2015 Japan Darts Masters (also known as the Zipang Casino Japan Darts Masters) was the inaugural staging of the tournament by the Professional Darts Corporation, as a second entry in the 2015 World Series of Darts. The tournament featured eight Japanese players who faced eight PDC players and was held at the Osanbashi Hall in Yokohama, Japan from 27–28 June 2015.

Phil Taylor won the inaugural staging of the Japan Darts Masters after defeating Peter Wright 8–7 in the final.

Prize money
The total prize fund was $200,000.

Qualifiers

The eight seeded PDC players were:

  Michael van Gerwen (semi-finals)
  Phil Taylor (winner)
  Gary Anderson (semi-finals)
  Adrian Lewis (quarter-finals)
  Peter Wright (runner-up)
  James Wade (quarter-finals)
  Raymond van Barneveld (quarter-finals)
  Stephen Bunting (quarter-finals)

The Japanese qualifiers were:
  Haruki Muramatsu (first round)
  Morihiro Hashimoto (first round)
  Sho Katsumi (first round)
  Masumi Chino (first round)
  Katsuya Aiba (first round)
  Yuki Yamada (first round)
  Shintaro Inoue (first round)
  Chikara Fujimori (first round)

Draw

Broadcasting
The tournament was available in the following countries on these channels:

References

Japan Darts Masters
World Series of Darts